HMS Capelin was a Royal Navy Ballahoo-class schooner carrying four 12-pounder carronades and a crew of 20. The prime contractor for the vessel was Goodrich & Co., in Bermuda, and she was launched in 1804. Like many of her class and the related Cuckoo-class schooners, she succumbed to the perils of the sea relatively early in her career.

Career
In May 1804 she was commissioned under Lieutenant Archibald McDonald (or M'Donald; acting) for the Halifax station. On 20 December 1806 he faced a court martial for his conduct after Capelin had run aground while under his command. The court decided that the charge was partly proven and so reprimanded him. It also ruled that he forfeit all seniority on the lieutenants' list. Still, McDonald was promoted to lieutenant on 22 December 1806 and commanded Capelin until February 1807. At some point, possibly in 1806, Lieutenant J. Beckett may have commanded her for a short period.

In 1807 Capelin was off Le Havre and under Lieutenant Thomas Delafons. On 11 August the ship Georgetown and the brig Robert arrived in Malta. A Spanish privateer had captured them off Sicilly, but Capelin had retaken them.

Lieutenant Josias Bray replaced Delafons and took command on 13 January 1808.

Fate
On 25 January Capelin was in company with Champion and Sybille when Sybille captured the Grand Argus. Capellin was reconnoitering the harbour at Brest, France when she hit the sunken Parquette Rock at 7am on 30 June. , the hired armed cutter Adrian and the cutter  all tried to get her off. However, no sooner had Entreprenante succeeded than water gushed in, causing Capelin to sink quickly, stern first. The vessels in attendance saved her crew. The subsequent court martial for the loss of Capelin reprimanded Bray for not being on deck when she approached the harbour. The court martial board also reprimanded Gunner's Mate Thomas Cole, who had been in charge of the watch, for not calling Bray when the haze had caused him to lose sight of the light at Pointe de Sainte Matthieu.

Citations

References
 
 
 
 
 

1804 ships
Ships built in Bermuda
Ballahoo-class schooners
Maritime incidents in 1808
Shipwrecks in the Bay of Biscay